Eryngium alpinum, the alpine sea holly, alpine eryngo or queen of the Alps, is a herbaceous perennial plant in the family Apiaceae.

Description
Eryngium alpinum is a hemicryptophyte, its overwintering buds are situated just below the soil surface and the floral axis more or less erect with a few leaves. The roots are deep and robust.

The stems are solitary and erect, usually with three branches on the apex and with longitudinal purple stripes. The cauline leaves are sessile and progressively more divided.

The inflorescences are dense umbels at the top of the main branches. They are bright green at the bases and the stiff, bristly bracts are blue. The flowers inside are about 2 mm long. The peripheral flowers are sterile and the internal flowers are hermaphroditic. Both types are actinomorphic and pentamerous, with five petals. Flowering occurs in July through September. The flowers are -insect-pollinated. The fruit is a spiny achene about half a centimeter wide.

Distribution and habitat
This plant is native to Austria, Liechtenstein, Croatia, France, Switzerland, Italy, and Slovenia.

Cultivation

Eryngium alpinum is cultivated as an ornamental plant for its blue and purple flowerheads. It requires dry, well-drained soil and full sun.

Conservation
Wild populations of the species are in decline due to overcollection for ornamental use and habitat degradation from recreational activity and grazing. Numerous local extinctions of subpopulations have occurred.

Gallery

References

External links

 Flora Europaea: Eryngium alpinum
 
 Acta Plantarum: Eryngium alpinum

alpinum
Flora of the Alps
Plants described in 1753
Taxa named by Carl Linnaeus